I Am Alive: Surviving the Andes Plane Crash is a 2010 television documentary recounting the tragedy of Uruguayan Air Force Flight 571 from the perspective of survivor Nando Parrado. It is a 2-hour special with reenactments of the October 13, 1972 crash and the 72-day struggle for survival that followed, including details of the  trek out of the mountains by Parrado and fellow survivor Roberto Canessa. I Am Alive was produced by AMS Pictures and premiered on the History Channel on October 20, 2010. It was released for DVD on February 22, 2011.

Critical reception 
Critic Linda Stasi of the New York Post awarded I Am Alive four stars, calling it "without question the finest survival documentary I have ever seen on TV."

References

External links 
 History.com
 AMS Pictures.com
 Nando Parrado's website
 http://www.alpineexpeditions.net/andes-survivors.html 

Uruguayan Air Force Flight 571
Mountaineering films
2010 television films
2010 films
1972 in Chile
American aviation films
History (American TV channel) original programming
American films based on actual events
Films about aviation accidents or incidents
2010 documentary films
2010s American films